Dolcinópolis is a municipality in the state of São Paulo in Brazil. The population is 2,112 (2020 est.) in an area of 77.9 km². The elevation is 463 m.

References

Municipalities in São Paulo (state)